This is a list of communities in Dubai, United Arab Emirates. Dubai is mainly divided into 9 sectors which are then divided into 226 communities, which are listed below.

See also
 List of Industrial areas in Dubai
 List of development projects in Dubai
 Developments in Dubai
626H Dubai Silicone oasis

References

Communities in Dubai
Location of communities in Dubai

 
Dubai
Geography of Dubai
communities